Edward James Silber (June 6, 1914 – October 26, 1976) was an outfielder in Major League Baseball. He played for the St. Louis Browns.

References

External links

1914 births
1976 deaths
Major League Baseball outfielders
St. Louis Browns players
Baseball players from Philadelphia
Temple Owls baseball players